Abū Jaʿfar Muḥammad ibn Yaʿqūb ibn Iṣḥāq al Kulaynī ar Rāzī (c. 250 AH/864 CE – 329 AH/941 CE) was a Persian Shia hadith collector.

Life
Al-Kulayni was born in Kulayn, a village or small town situated near Rey, Iran. His father was Ya'qub al-Kulayni, who is buried at Rey. He lived in the era of the Minor Occultation of Hujjat-Allah al-Mahdi, the last of the Twelve Imams who, according to Shia belief, is currently in occultation and will certainly appear before the Day of Judgment). He is claimed to have greatly benefited from al-Mahdi's divine knowledge by interacting with him through the Imam's Deputies.

Kulayni received his early religious education in his native town and went to Rey for further education. According to Shia view he is among a special class of muhaddithin known as Rihalah-ye hadith (which means those who travelled in order to collect a hadith and met the persons considered to be the authority on hadith).

He travelled to Baghdad for this reason and lived there for twenty years, engaged in teaching and pursuing academic work, until he died in 329 AH/941 CE. He is considered the foremost Shia compiler of hadith and was the author of Kitab al-Kafi.

Work and contribution
Although Shaykh al-Kulaynī is most famous for al-Kāfī, this opus was not his only accomplishment. The following is a list of his known works:
 Kitāb al Kāfī
 Rasāʾil al ʾaʾimmah
 Kitāb ar-rijāl
 Kitāb ar radd ʿalā al qarāmitah
 Kitāb mā qīla fī al ʾaʾimmah min ash-shiʿr
 Kitāb taʿbīr al-ruʾyā
Sadly, of these only al-Kāfī has survived in its entirety.

See also
 Tafsir Numani
 Tafsir Qomi
 Sharif al-Murtaza
 Al-Sharif al-Radi
 Al-Shaykh Al-Mufid
 Al-Hurr al-Aamili

References

External links
 Classical Islam: A Sourcebook of Religious Literature by Norman Calder, J A Mojaddedi, Andrew Rippin 
 The Formative Period of Twelver Shi'Ism: Hadith As Discourse Between Qum and Baghdad by Andrew J Newman 
 Great Shiite Works: Al-Kafi by Al-Kulayni by I. K. A. Howard in al Serat Journal. 
 'Al-Kafi' by Al-Kulayni by Dr. I. K. A. Howard Al-Serat, Vol. 2 (1976), No. 1 
 The Trustworthy of Islam Kulayni  No such page found – October 24, 2012
 The Buyid Domination as the Historical Background for the Flourishing of Muslim Scholarship During the 4th/10th Century by Dr. M. Ismail Marcinkowski*  October 24, 2012
 Shaikh Mohammed bin Yaqoob bin Ishaq Kulaini.  & Al Kafi 
 Islamic Texts Institute
  "Al-Kafi Book I: Intellect and Foolishness" 

860s births
941 deaths
People from Ray, Iran
Iranian Shia scholars of Islam
10th-century Islamic religious leaders
9th-century Iranian people
10th-century Iranian people
Hadith compilers